David Stuart Rose  Democrat (June 30, 1856 – August 8, 1932) was an American lawyer and Democratic politician.

Background 
Born in Darlington, Wisconsin, Rose joined his father's law firm in Darlington. He served as mayor of Darlington in 1883 and 1884 and was county judge of Lafayette County, Wisconsin.

Move to Milwaukee 
In 1886, he moved to Milwaukee where he practiced law and was twice elected mayor of the city of Milwaukee, Wisconsin serving from 1898 to 1906 and from 1908 to 1910, when he was defeated by Socialist Emil Seidel. He was the 1902 Democratic nominee for Governor of Wisconsin, running a conservative campaign losing to incumbent Robert M. La Follette by a wide margin.

His administration was known for widespread corruption. Under "All the Time Rosy", Milwaukee had a reputation as a "wide-open" town that tolerated prostitution, gambling and late-night saloons. As historian John Gurda put it, "Virtually everything that was not nailed down - from public hay supplies to aldermanic votes - was for sale to the highest bidder." After spending some time in California trying to promote trade with China, Rose returned to Milwaukee and ran once again for mayor in 1924 but lost the election to Socialist Daniel Hoan.

Back to Lafayette County 
Rose later returned to Darlington and in 1931 ran once more (unsuccessfully) for county judge of Lafayette County. He died in Milwaukee on August 8, 1932, and is buried in Darlington.

See also
 Twin Buttes, Arizona

Notes

External links

1856 births
1932 deaths
People from Darlington, Wisconsin
Mayors of Milwaukee
Wisconsin lawyers
Wisconsin state court judges